Temptation is a 1915 American silent romantic drama film directed and produced by Cecil B. DeMille. The film starred Geraldine Farrar and Theodore Roberts and was written by and based on an original story by Hector Turnbull. Additional writing was done by DeMille and Jeanie MacPherson, who did not receive screen credit. Temptation is now considered a lost film.

Cast
 Geraldine Farrar as Renee Dupree
 Theodore Roberts as Otto Mueller
 Pedro de Cordoba as Julian
 Elsie Jane Wilson as Madame Maroff
 Raymond Hatton as Baron Cheurial
 Sessue Hayakawa as Opera Admirer
 Jessie Arnold (uncredited)
 Tex Driscoll (uncredited)
 Ernest Joy (uncredited)
 Anita King (uncredited)
 Lucien Littlefield (uncredited)

See also
List of lost films

References

External links

Temptation at SilentEra

1915 films
1915 romantic drama films
1915 lost films
American romantic drama films
American silent feature films
American black-and-white films
Famous Players-Lasky films
Films directed by Cecil B. DeMille
Lost American films
Lost romantic drama films
Paramount Pictures films
1910s American films
Silent romantic drama films
Silent American drama films
1910s English-language films